David Airey (born 26 April 1948) is a New Zealand cricketer who played in six first-class matches for Wellington in 1977/78.

See also
 List of Wellington representative cricketers

References

External links
 

1948 births
Living people
New Zealand cricketers
Wellington cricketers
Cricketers from Wellington City